Stony Creek Township is one of fourteen townships in Madison County, Indiana, United States. As of the 2010 census, its population was 3,871 and it contained 1,613 housing units.

It was named from a stream in the northwestern part.

Geography

Cities, towns, villages
 Lapel

Unincorporated towns
 Bloomer at 
 Edgewood Village at 
 Fishersburg at 
(This list is based on USGS data and may include former settlements.)

Cemeteries
The township contains these two cemeteries: Brookside and Old Woodward.

Major highways
  Indiana State Road 32

Education
 Frankton-Lapel Community Schools

Stony Creek Township residents may obtain a free library card from the Anderson Public Library in Anderson.

Political districts
 Indiana's 6th congressional district
 State House District 37
 State Senate District 20

References
 
 United States Census Bureau 2008 TIGER/Line Shapefiles
 IndianaMap

External links
 Stony Creek Township Website
 Indiana Township Association
 United Township Association of Indiana
 City-Data.com page for Stony Creek Township
 Town of Lapel

Townships in Madison County, Indiana
Townships in Indiana